Mary Edly-Allen was a Democratic member of the Illinois House of Representatives for the 51st district. The district at the time, located in Lake County, included all or parts Deer Park, Forest Lake, Green Oaks, Hawthorn Woods, Kildeer, Lake Barrington, Lake Zurich, Libertyville, Long Grove, Mundelein and North Barrington.

Edly-Allen, a teacher from Libertyville, defeated appointed Republican incumbent Helene Walsh of Mundelein in the 2018 general election. In the 2020 general election, Republican candidate Chris Bos defeated Edly-Allen.

Electoral history

References

External links
 Official legislative website
 Official campaign website

Year of birth missing (living people)
21st-century American women politicians
21st-century American politicians
American women educators
Educators from Illinois
Democratic Party members of the Illinois House of Representatives
People from Libertyville, Illinois
Women state legislators in Illinois
Living people